Kružić is a Croatian surname, the root of which is the word krug, . Notable people with the surname include:

Marin Kružić (born 1989), Croatian handball player
Petar Kružić (1491–1537), Croatian knez, captain, soldier and defender of Klis

Croatian surnames